Tomax and Xamot Paoli (also called the Crimson Twins or Crimson Guard Commanders) are fictional characters from the G.I. Joe: A Real American Hero toyline, comic books and animated series. They are the co-leaders of Cobra's elite troops, the Crimson Guard, and debuted in 1985. Their preliminary names were Movat and Tovam.

Profile
The Paoli brothers speak in notable accents which show they are from Corsica. The brothers were at some point members of the Unione Corse (Corsican Brotherhood), served in the French Foreign Legion's 1erREP in Algeria, then as mercenaries in Africa (Congo, southern Africa) and South America. While they relished this, they realized they would soon become too old and weak to be soldiers forever, so they changed careers and studied banking in Zurich, Switzerland. Unhappy with the world of corporate finance, the brothers found the opportunities available in international terrorism far more suited to their abilities, and joined Cobra. Their specialties are in infiltration, espionage (military and industrial), sabotage, propaganda, and corporate law.

Like the Crimson Guard that they lead, Xamot and Tomax also lead the "respectable" corporate face of Cobra as the founders, owners, and CEOs of Extensive Enterprises. When not engaged in terrorism, they efficiently manage Cobra's business affairs in shirt and tie. Their preferred mode of attack is through brains over brawn, using the law to serve the purposes of Cobra. They have covered their paper trail and connection to Cobra so well, that it is thought to be impossible to prove a connection between them and the terrorist organization.

The twin brothers are mirror images of each other; Tomax's hair is parted on the right side of his head and Xamot's on the left; the piping on their uniforms goes up the opposite side on each twin; the brothers' names are mirror images of one another. The only distinguishing mark between the two is a scar on Xamot's right cheek. Tomax and Xamot share an empathic connection commonly known as "The Corsican Syndrome" in which identical twins are believed to be psychically bonded, in a manner similar to The Corsican Brothers (1844) by Alexandre Dumas, père. While this psychic connection is often useful, as it allows them to communicate wordlessly, finish each other's sentences, and speak in unison, it is also a liability as they feel each other's pain.

Toys
Tomax and Xamot were first released as action figures in 1985. Included in their package were laser pistols and a zip-line with skyhook.

The filecards for the 2008 version of the figures list their last name as Rogue.

Comics

Marvel Comics 
In the Marvel Comics G.I. Joe series, the twins first appeared in G.I. Joe: A Real American Hero #37 (July 1985). They fight G.I. Joe forces throughout a busy amusement park, attempting to ambush Gung-Ho and Blowtorch. They are defeated when the Joes play "possum"; the Twins do not realize the amusement park's ride has stopped their machine gun fire.

Their forces, the Crimson Guard, are shown as capable battlefield soldiers and respectable businessmen. As the latter, they are to gain as much economic influence as possible, solely for the benefit of Cobra.

A Joe team, assisted by Sierra Gordo revolutionaries, assaults a Cobra fortress, one of many in a style called Terror Drome. During the confrontations, the twins man a helicopter gunship and badly injure Stalker. Other Joes destroy the helicopter but the twins (and Stalker) survive. Later, the Joes completely take the fortress. Having prepared, Tomax and Xamot purposely wait until the Joes are inside before attempting to activate several explosive devices. This fails, as the Joes had brought their own explosive expert, Tripwire.

In issue #109, the Twins and their forces do capture a squad of Joe members. They misinterpret an order from Cobra Commander and incorrectly believe that they must now execute all the Joes. While they are unwilling to outright kill the subdued prisoners, a S.A.W. Viper willingly fires into the prisoners, killing Doc, Heavy Metal, Crankcase and Thunder. The survivors injure the Viper with a hidden knife and escape. In the ensuing pursuit, the prisoners commandeer a Cobra vehicle, which is fired upon by other Cobra forces. Breaker, Crazylegs and Quick Kick are killed while the survivors make it back to Joe territory.

Devil's Due 
Years later, in the Devil's Due series, the Twins fall under the influence of Destro's son, who has infected them with multi-function nanites. Their businesses still continue, such as working with Ripper to promote his soda company. After the nanite threat is neutralized, the twins activate Crimson Guardsmen in order to provide support to the now-free Cobra Commander.

They continue to broker most deals for Cobra. The twins lead the unsuccessful hunt for the Cobra Island Joe infiltrator, "Barrel Roll", and were in charge of the secret construction of Monolith Base in Badhikstan, but after G.I. Joe raided the base, they fled with Cobra Commander to a cave. There, Red Shadows agent Dela Eden arrived and unleashed gunfire on the group.

In the G.I. Joe Special Missions: Antarctica one-shot, a Joe team broke up an illegal oil drilling operation that was run by Tomax, who was able to escape. During the story, Xamot was strangely absent. In one scene Tomax talked to his brother as if he were present, despite the scene showing an empty chair. The whereabouts of Xamot were revealed in another story in the same issue, when G.I. Joe raided a Cobra medical facility and found Xamot, in a coma and unresponsive (presumably from the Red Shadows attack). Xamot is then held in G.I. Joe custody, still in a coma.

Some months later, Tomax leads a raid on "The Coffin", a G.I. Joe maximum-security prison located in Greenland, to rescue his brother and free other Cobra operatives. He successfully frees his brother and several other Cobra agents. Off panel, the invading Cobra forces cause the death of 'loose ends' held at the Coffin, including Cobra operatives Monkeywrench and Dr. Biggles-Jones. Tomax and Xamot are captured by the Joes in the final battle with Cobra. Both are sent to the Coffin.

Devil's Due - G.I. Joe vs. Transformers
Tomax and Xamot also appeared in the second G.I. Joe vs. the Transformers mini-series by Devil's Due. In it, Tomax and Xamot had used Cybertronian technology to become human-looking cyborgs who, when touching each other, shoot a massive blast. In order to avoid them using that power, Shockwave kills Xamot. Tomax later appears, grieving.

IDW Publishing

In this new IDW continuity, Tomax and Xamot are revealed to be French and originally part of the Unione Corse. They set up their security company Extensive Enterprises, which was co-opted by Cobra; while Tomax enjoys being part of Cobra, he is unaware Xamot has become disgruntled and no longer trusts his brother. Xamot is badly beaten by Chuckles, who then self-destructs a nuclear missile payload on board a Cobra submarine, sacrificing himself and Xamot in the process. Tomax survives.

Tomax eventually cuts a deal with G.I. Joe, offering to use his resources through Extensive Enterprises, to help the group find members of Cobra for captured. As part of the deal, Tomax was allowed to operate a casino in Las Vegas to create a cover that he was still involved in criminal activities, under the watchful eyes of Flint.

Animated series

Sunbow
Tomax and Xamot are first introduced in the G.I. Joe miniseries "Pyramid of Darkness". They appear as the commanders of the Crimson Guard, as well as the heads of Extensive Enterprises. Unlike the comics, the twins in the cartoon were often cagey, self-interested, and eager to seize power for themselves, although they garner little support from other Cobra members and their attempts are usually quashed by Cobra Commander. They share a psychic link, and feel one another's pain, which the Joes use to their advantage several times in battle. When the two are together and speaking, they speak in tandem, often finishing each other's sentences. 

At the beginning of the second season, Tomax and Xamot join Doctor Mindbender and Destro in creating Serpentor, also having grown tired of Cobra Commander's failures. But as soon as Serpentor is brought to life and orders his attack and invasion of the United States, Tomax and Xamot are the first to point out the sheer impossibility of such an attack. Their objections are quickly silenced when Serpentor begins to throttle them.

In the un-produced third season of the original Sunbow/Marvel series, Tomax and Xamot were planned to be the season's main villains, with most of Cobra-La and the Cobra Organization being destroyed at the end of the film. Tomax and Xamot would then form a new criminal organization known as "the Coil" to fight against the Joes. This season never went into production due to the abrupt cancellation of the series by Hasbro.

In the cartoon, Tomax was voiced by Corey Burton and Xamot by Michael Bell.

G.I. Joe: The Movie
In G.I. Joe: The Movie, Tomax and Xamot, along with the rest of the Cobra High Command, are angry at Cobra Commander for his failures and side with Cobra-La. They are seen fighting the Joes in the final battle, until a huge explosion destroys all of Cobra-La.

DiC
Tomax and Xamot are not seen again in the DiC-produced third season. Their old headquarters, the Extensive Enterprises building, is seen, however, and General Hawk mentions that they closed them down. The building itself has been abandoned and is being used as a secret Cobra base. The Crimson Guard, however, are still present, in the form of the Crimson Guard Immortals. However, they are used more as a grunt force, as opposed to an elite group.

G.I. Joe: Renegades
Tomax and Xamot appear in G.I. Joe: Renegades voiced by Stephen Stanton, dubbing themselves as the "Brothers of Light" due to their psychic abilities to manipulate others into do their bidding when standing together. Their psychic link is strong to the point of empathy: if one is in pain, the other feels it. Tomax and Xamot use their powers to "fleece" believers whom they brainwash into their cult with a machine that enhances their psychic abilities, planning on expanding their cult worldwide. The Joes travel to their desert oasis while searching for Doctor Mindbender, who is searching for a psychic for his research. Both fall under their control, who use the latter to siphon Cobra bank accounts and the former as their elite guard of soldiers, named the "Crimson Guard". Only Tunnel Rat and Snake Eyes manage to stay out of their control as they eventually expose the brothers' deception to their followers.

Forced to destroy their base of operations, Tomax and Xamot convince Doctor Mindbender to take them with him to escape retaliation. However, the two soon find themselves being subjected to Mindbender's experiments in improving Bio-Vipers such as creation of the prototype Shadow-Vipers, mentally commanded by Storm Shadow. Later, during the events of the "Union of the Snake", Cobra attempts to use their abilities to control various telecommunication company heads. After their plan is foiled by the Joes, Tomax and Xamot manage to break free of their bonds and take revenge by mesmerizing the Baroness and Mindbender into fighting each other for their amusement, before realizing the need to escape when the authorities arrive. Soon after, the brothers ponder about spreading their cause through telecommunications.

Video games
Tomax and Xamot are featured as bosses in the 1992 G.I. Joe arcade game.

Live action film
In G.I. Joe: Retaliation, during the US President's press conference, one of the news vans has the logo for Extensive Enterprises, the Cobra front company run by the Crimson Guard commanders Tomax and Xamot.

In popular culture
 In the Family Guy episode "Big Man on Hippocampus", Brian and Stewie tell an amnesiac Peter that they are called Tomax and Xamot and feel each other's pain.
 The twins' business venture is discussed in the non-fiction book Powerplay.

References

External links
 Tomax & Xamot at JMM's G.I. Joe Comics Home Page
 Tomax & Xamot at The Inner Sanctum fansite

Animated duos
Villains in animated television series
Cobra (G.I. Joe) agents
Comics characters introduced in 1985
Fictional businesspeople
Fictional commanders
Fictional French people
Fictional cult leaders
Fictional French Army personnel
Fictional henchmen
Fictional kidnappers
Fictional private military members
Fictional twins